Leonid Veniaminovitch Volodarskiy ( is a Russian translator, writer, and weekly radio show author. He is mostly known in Russia as one of the home video voice-over translators of 1990s  by a movies, such as The Empire Strikes Back, Terminator dilogy, Last Action Hero, A Nightmare on Elm Street and others. Volodarskiy was also the first translator of Stephen King books into Russian.

Biography

Dmitry Puchkov's parody 
Dmitry Puchkov, known in Russia as «Goblin», parodied Volodarskiy's voice in his humorous dub of Star Wars: Episode I – The Phantom Menace named Star Wars: Storm in the Glass.

References

See also 
 Gavrilov translation

1950 births
Living people
Soviet translators
20th-century Russian translators